Acey Duecy is the third studio album by American R&B singer Anthony David, released on June 24, 2008, by Universal Republic and SoulBird.

Track listing
 "Stop Playin'" (A. Harrington, B. Burch, C. Johnson) — 3:47
 "Something About You" (W. Badarou, P. Gould, R. Gould, M. King, M. Lindup) — 4:53
 "Smoke One" (A. Harrington, B. Burch, O. Ferrer) — 4:05
 "Words" (Featuring India.Arie) (A. Harrington, I. Simpson) — 4:01
 "Lady" (Featuring Keisha Jackson) (A. Harrington, L. Jefferson) — 4:39
 "Spittin' Game" (A. Harrington, L. Jefferson) — 4:13
 "Kinfolk" (A. Harrington, B. Burch, C. Johnson, S. Sanders, C. Barnes) — 4:26
 "GA Peach" (A. Harrington, N. Barnes, L. Jefferson) — 4:25
 "Cheatin' Man" (A. Harrington, E. Stokes) — 4:42
 "Cold Turkey" (A. Harrington, L. Jefferson) — 4:38
 "Krooked Kop" (A. Harrington, L. Jefferson) — 4:58

Personnel 
Anthony Bailey – horn
Sandy Brummels – creative director
Branden Burch – piano, keyboards, programming, producer, engineer, mixing
Cekoya Renee Burch – vocals
Anthony David – guitar, vocals, producer, engineer
Omar Ferrer – programming
Anthony Harrington – producer
India.Arie – vocals
Keisha Jackson – vocals
LaMarquis Mark Jefferson – bass, percussion, drums, producer, engineer, mixing
Vaughn Jefferson – upright bass
Chris Johnson – bass, guitar, percussion, drums, keyboards, programming, producer
Christopher Kornmann – art direction, design
Jonathan Lloyd – horn
Alex Lowe – producer, mixing
Larry Nix – organ
Billy Odum – guitar, soloist
Anthony Papamichael – guitar
Omar Phillips – percussion, drums
Shannon Sanders – vocals
Victor Smiley – guitar
Ryan Waters – guitar

Chart performance
The album peaked at No. 7 on the Billboard Top Heatseekers chart and No. 30 on the Billboard Top R&B/Hip-Hop Albums chart.

Chart positions

References

2008 albums
Anthony David (singer) albums